Andrew Cyster (born 31 March 1979) is a South African former cricketer. He played in one List A and seven first-class matches for Boland from 2000/01 to 2002/03.

See also
 List of Boland representative cricketers

References

External links
 

1979 births
Living people
South African cricketers
Boland cricketers
People from Stellenbosch
Cricketers from the Western Cape